Cherokee Mans Run (also called Cherokee Creek) is a stream located entirely within Logan County, Ohio.

Cherokee Mans Run was named for a Cherokee Indian who settled there.

See also
List of rivers of Ohio

References

Rivers of Logan County, Ohio
Rivers of Ohio